Ruslyakov is a Russian masculine surname, its feminine counterpart is Ruslyakova. It may refer to
Irina Ruslyakova (born 1975), Russian badminton player
Mikhail Ruslyakov (born 1972), Russian football player
Valentin Ruslyakov (born 1972), Ukrainian judoka

Russian-language surnames